India and Maldives are neighbours sharing a maritime border. Relations have been friendly and close in strategic, economic and military cooperation. India continues to contribute to maintaining security on the island nation.

History 

Maldives is located south of India's Lakshadweep Islands in the Indian Ocean. Both nations established diplomatic relations after the independence of Maldives from British rule in 1966. India was one of the first nations to recognise Maldives' independence. Since then, India and Maldives have developed close strategic, military, economic and cultural relations. India has supported Maldives' policy of keeping regional issues and struggles away from itself, and the latter has seen friendship with India as a source of aid as well as a counterbalance to Sri Lanka, which is in proximity to the island nation and its largest trading partner.

Bilateral treaties and strategic partnership

1976 Maritime treaty 

In December 1976, India and the Maldives signed a maritime boundary treaty to agree on maritime boundaries. Treaty explicitly places Minicoy on the Indian side of the boundary. India and Maldives officially and amicably decided their maritime boundary in 1976. A minor diplomatic incident occurred in 1982 when the brother of the President of Maldives Maumoon Abdul Gayoom  gave a speech that India mistook as a claim that the neighboring Minicoy Island that belonged to India were a part of Maldives; Maldives rapidly officially denied that it was laying claim to the island and explained that President Maumoon's brother had in fact been talking about the cultural connections between Maldives and Minicoy.

1988 Comprehensive trade agreement 

In 1981, India and Maldives signed a comprehensive trade agreement. Both nations are founding members of the South Asian Association for Regional Cooperation (SAARC), the South Asian Economic Union and signatories to the South Asia Free Trade Agreement. Indian and Maldivian leaders have maintained high-level contacts and consultations on regional issues.

Commercial relations 
Since the success of Operation Cactus, the relations between India and Maldives have expanded significantly. India has provided extensive economic aid and has participated in bilateral programmes for the development of infrastructure, health, telecommunications and labour resources. It established the Indira Gandhi Memorial Hospital in Malé, the capital of Maldives, expanded telecommunications and air links and increased scholarships for Maldivian students. While India's exports to Maldives during 2006 were worth ₹384 crore, imports were worth less than ₹6 crore. The State Bank of India has contributed more than US$500 million to aid the economic expansion of Maldives. India and Maldives have announced plans to jointly work to expand fisheries and tuna processing.

Military relations 
In April 2006 Indian Navy gifted a Trinkat Class Fast Attack Craft of 46 m length to Maldives National Defence Force's Coast Guard.

India started the process to bring the island country into India's security grid. The move comes after the moderate Islamic nation approached New Delhi earlier in 2009, over fears that one of its island resorts could be taken over by terrorists given its lack of military assets and surveillance capabilities. India has also signed an agreement which includes following:
 India will permanently base two helicopters in the country to enhance its surveillance capabilities and ability to respond swiftly to threats.
 Maldives has coastal radars on only two of its 26 atolls. India will help set up radars on all 26 for seamless coverage of approaching vessels and aircraft.
 The coastal radar chain in Maldives will be networked with the Indian coastal radar system. India has already undertaken a project to install radars along its entire coastline. The radar chains of the two countries will be interlinked and a central control room in India's Coastal Command will get a seamless radar picture.
 The Indian Coast Guard (ICG) will carry out regular Dornier sorties over the island nation to look out for suspicious movements or vessels. The Southern Naval Command will overlook the inclusion of Maldives into the Indian security grid.
 Military teams from Maldives will visit the tri-services Andaman Nicobar Command (ANC) to observe how India manages security and surveillance of the critical island chain.
 Ekuverin, an annual joint military exercise is held every year since 2009 between India and Maldives. The exercise aims to enhance the interoperability between the Indian Army and Maldives National Defence Force in order to effectively undertake counter-terrorism operations in urban or semi-urban environments.

Operations and events

1988 Maldives coup d'état attempt

The 1988 Maldives coup d'état attempt was by a group of Maldivians led by businessman Abdullah Luthufi and assisted by armed mercenaries of a Tamil secessionist organisation from Sri Lanka, the People's Liberation Organisation of Tamil Eelam, to overthrow the government in the island republic of Maldives. The mercenaries quickly gained control of the capital, including the major government buildings, airport, port, television and radio stations. The intervention by the Indian Armed Forces, codenamed Operation Cactus, defeated the attempted coup.

The Indian paratroopers immediately secured the airfield, crossed over to Malé using commandeered boats and rescued President Gayoom. The paratroopers restored control of the capital to President Gayoom's government within hours. Some of the mercenaries fled toward Sri Lanka in a hijacked freighter. Those unable to reach the ship in time were quickly rounded up and handed over to the Maldives government. Nineteen people reportedly died in the fighting, most of them mercenaries. The dead included two hostages killed by the mercenaries. The Indian Navy frigates Godavari and Betwa intercepted the freighter off the Sri Lankan coast, and captured the mercenaries. The swift intervention by the Indian military and accurate intelligence successfully quelled the attempted coup d'état.

2014 Malé Water Shortage Crisis (MWSC) 

In the wake of a drinking water crisis in Malé on 4 December 2014, following collapse of the island's only water treatment plant, Maldives urged India for immediate help. India came to rescue by sending its heavy lift transporters like C-17 Globemaster III, Il-76 carrying bottled water. The Indian Navy also sent her ships like ,  and others which can produce fresh water using their onboard desalination plants. The humanitarian relief efforts by the Indian side was widely appreciated in Malé across all sections of people, with the Vice-President of Maldives thanking the Indian ambassador for swift action.

2011–2015 Maldives political crisis 

Maldives' first democratically elected president from 2008 to 2012 Mohammed Nasheed, was arrested on 22 February 2015 on terror charges. India and US expressed concern over Nasheed's arrest and manhandling. Indian PM Modi was to also visit Maldives in the second week of March as a part four nation visit to Indian Ocean neighbours. But, he later omitted Maldives from his tour.

2020 COVID-19 crisis 
During the COVID-19 crisis of 2020, India extended help to Maldives in the form of financial, material and logistical support.

In April 2020, India provided $150 million currency swap support to help Maldives mitigate the financial impact of COVID-19. Also in April, at the request of the Maldivian government, the Indian Air Force airlifted 6.2 tonnes of essential medicines and hospital consumables to Maldives, as part of 'Operation Sanjeevani'. These supplies had been procured by Maldives's State Trading Organisation from suppliers in India, but could not be transported due to the COVID-19 lockdown. India had also earlier despatched a medical team  with essential medicines to help Maldives fight the COVID outbreak as well as supplied essential food grains and edibles despite logistical challenges in wake of lockdown. This operation was called Operation Sanjeevani.

Civil society perception of India 
Maldivians generally regard Indians and India as a friend and trusted neighbour in the economic, social and political fields, although there has been a strong anti-India stance taken by some sections of the society, expressed under the 'India Out' campaign, which was alleged by the Indian High Commission to be "motivated, malicious, and increasingly personal". Both nations share historical and cultural ties.

Joint Projects in Maldives

Uthuru Thila Falhu Naval Base Harbour 
India extended a $50 million Line of Credit to Maldives for defense projects, mainly for the development, support and maintenance of the harbour of the Uthuru Thila Falhu Naval Base.

Greater Malé Connectivity Project 

In 2021, the Maldivian Ministry of National Planning, Housing and Infrastructure signed a $500 million infrastructure project for a 6.7 km bridge & causeway link with the Indian engineering company AFCONS. The 6.74-km bridge and causeway link will connect the capital of Malé with the islands of Villingili, Gulhifalhu and Thilafushi. It is being funded through a grant of $100 million and a line of credit of $400 million from India, and will boost connectivity between the four islands that account for almost half of the Maldivian population.

See also
 Indians in the Maldives
 Maldivians in India
 South Asian Association for Regional Cooperation (SAARC)

References 

 
Maldivdes
Bilateral relations of the Maldives
India and the Commonwealth of Nations
Maldives and the Commonwealth of Nations